Anthony P. Savarese Jr. (July 24, 1917 – August 5, 2002) was an American politician who served in the New York State Assembly from 1949 to 1964.

He died on August 5, 2002, in Port Washington, New York at age 85.

References

1917 births
2002 deaths
Republican Party members of the New York State Assembly
20th-century American politicians